Alain Cribier, FACC, FESC (born 1945) is a French interventional cardiologist, who is a Professor of Medicine and Director of Cardiology at the University of Rouen's Charles Nicolle Hospital. Alain Cribier is best known for performing the world's first transcatheter aortic valve implantation in 2002, the first mitral commissurotomy in 1995 and the first balloon aortic valvuloplasty in 1986.

Education
Cribier obtained his MD medical degree at the University of Paris and completed his early residency training there. Cribier began his cardiology residency at the University of Rouen in 1972 and in 1976 he spent a year in an interventional cardiology fellowship at the Cedars-Sinai Hospital in Los Angeles, California.

Career
In 1983, Cribier was promoted to a Professor of Medicine and the Director of the Catheterization Lab at the University of Rouen. He developed and performed the world's first balloon aortic valvuloplasty in 1986.  He performed the world's first mitral commissurotomy in 1995. Following discovery that the balloon aortic valvuloplasty for severe aortic stenosis was not effective in 80% of patients after one year he performed the first ever TAVI in 2002. This procedure has now spread across the world and has saved countless patient's lives. In 1996, Cribier founded the Indo-French Foundation of Interventional Cardiology.

In 2011, Cribier was made Professor Emeritus at the Department of Cardiology at the University Hospital Charles Nicolle in Rouen (France).

Since 2013, Cribier has run the MTC (Medical Training Center) in Rouen (France), a multidisciplinary center dedicated to learning medicine through simulation, video-conferences and training between surgeons, physicians and experts.

Awards and memberships
FACC - Fellow of the American College of Cardiology
FESC - Fellow of the European Society of Cardiology
Ray C. Fish Award
In 2017, Cribier received the Scientific Grand Prize of the Lefoulon-Delalande Fondation.
In 2016, Cribier received the Legend of Medicine Award, C3 meeting in Orlando (USA) and the Gold Medal Award from the European Society of Cardiology in Rome, Italy.
In 2015, Cribier received the Life Time Achievement Award, India-Live meeting in Chennai, India.

See also
 John G. Webb - performed the first transapical transcatheter aortic valve implantation in 2006

References

1945 births
Living people
French cardiologists
University of Paris alumni
Fellows of the American College of Cardiology
French expatriates in the United States